Marcelo Magnasco (born 23 June 1958) is an Argentine fencer. He competed in the foil and épée events at the 1984 Summer Olympics.

References

External links
 

1958 births
Living people
Argentine male fencers
Argentine épée fencers
Argentine foil fencers
Olympic fencers of Argentina
Fencers at the 1984 Summer Olympics